Ted Reader is a Canadian chef and author of several cookbooks.

Biography
Reader is from Paris, Ontario, and is a graduate of George Brown College's culinary management program. Beginning his career in local restaurants, he eventually became executive chef at the Skydome Hotel at Rogers Centre in Toronto. He later held a five-year tenure as executive chef of President's Choice.

For nine years, Reader was the featured grill chef on the series Cottage Country, and he was also a team chef with Cart Racing for three seasons, for drivers Adrian Fernandez and Roberto Moreno. He has also made regular guest appearances on Citytv’s Breakfast Television, Toronto’s AM 640, and is a part of Rock Mornings with Craig Venn and Lucky on 94.9 The Rock. He is the author of several cookbooks including Sticks and Stones: The Art of Grilling on Plank, and Vine and Stone, which was awarded the Silver Medal in the Cuisine Canada 2000 Cookbook Awards. Other cookbooks include Napoleon's Everyday Gourmet Grilling, Napoleon's Everyday Gourmet Plank Grilling, and Napoleon's Everyday Gourmet Burgers which were bestsellers in Canada.

Reader also has a line of sauces and products, called Ted's World Famous BBQ. Products include "Beerlicious BBQ Sauce", "Crazy Canuck BBQ Sauce", "Pineapple Rum BBQ Sauce", "Apple Brown Betty BBQ Sauce", "Orgasmic Onion", "Bone Dust" and "Maple and Cedar Planks".

In 2010, Reader attempted to set a world record for the largest hamburger, grilling a 268-kilogram burger in downtown Toronto as part of a promotional tour for a cookbook.

References

External links
Official webpage
Ted Reader at the Chef and Restaurant Database

Canadian television chefs
Living people
Writers from Ontario
Canadian cookbook writers
People from the County of Brant
George Brown College alumni
Year of birth missing (living people)
Canadian male chefs